Le Mayet-de-Montagne is a commune in the Allier department in central France.

Geography
Le Mayet-de-Montagne is situated 16.6 miles south of Vichy in the north part of the Massif Central. It is situated at an altitude of around 1,800 feet.

History
In 1334, le Mayet de Montagne belonged to Auvergne. The counts of Auvergne considered Le Mayet to be of great strategic value, and they held onto the town until 1589, when Henri IV decided to alter the borders of Bourbonnais to include Le Mayet.

Le Mayet became the chef-lieu of its eponymous canton in 1790.

Population

See also
Communes of the Allier department

References

Communes of Allier
Bourbonnais
Allier communes articles needing translation from French Wikipedia